115th meridian may refer to:

115th meridian east, a line of longitude east of the Greenwich Meridian
115th meridian west, a line of longitude west of the Greenwich Meridian